The Manitoba Liberal Party fielded 57 candidates in the 1986 provincial election, one of whom was elected.  Some of the party's candidates have their own biography pages; information about others may be found here.

Gail Stapon (Concordia)

Stapon is a realtor, and was listed as president of the North End Housing Project in 2002.  She has stood for the Manitoba Liberal Party on two occasions.

Gilbert Benoit (Elmwood)

Benoit received 389 votes (5.50%), finishing third against New Democratic Party candidate Jim Maloway.

In 1995, a Gilbert Benoit was listed as co-owner of Ronin Records in Winnipeg. There is also a Gilbert Benoit employed with Ceridian Canada Ltd. as of 2007.  It is possible that these are the same person.

Footnotes

1986